Byun Yo-han (born April 29, 1986) is a South Korean actor. He is best known for his roles in the television dramas Misaeng: Incomplete Life (2014),  Six Flying Dragons (2015–2016), and Mr. Sunshine (2018). He has also appeared in several independent films including Socialphobia (2015) and The Book of Fish (2021).

Career
He made his acting debut in 2011, and appeared in over 30 short films as a student of Korea National University of Arts. The then-unknown actor rose to fame in 2014 with a supporting role in the popular workplace cable series Misaeng: Incomplete Life.

In 2015, he starred in leading roles in indie hit Socialphobia and the romantic comedy Ex-Girlfriends' Club. In the same year, he also appeared as one of the six main leads in SBS's 50-episode historical drama Six Flying Dragons playing a master swordsman. Byun then starred alongside Kim Yoon-seok in the fantasy drama film Will You Be There?.

In 2018, he starred in the hit drama Mr. Sunshine, which became one of the highest-rated dramas in Korean cable television history. 

In 2021, Byun starred in Lee Joon-ik's black-and-white historical film The Book of Fish, for which he was nominated for the Baeksang Arts Award for Best Actor – Film.

Filmography

Film

Television series

Theater

Awards and nominations

References

External links 

 Byun Yo-han at Saram Entertainment 

1986 births
Living people
South Korean male film actors
South Korean male television actors
21st-century South Korean male actors
Korea National University of Arts alumni
People from Incheon
Chogye Byeon clan